Restelli is a surname. Notable people with the surname include:

Antonio Restelli (1877–1945), Italian cyclist
Dino Restelli (1924–2006), American baseball player
Francesco Restelli (1814-1890), Italian lawyer, activist and politician
Mark Restelli (born 1986), Canadian football linebacker